Back Creek is a small rural locality in the Bland Shire, part of the Riverina region of New South Wales, Australia.

References

Towns in New South Wales